Union Township is a township in Louisa County, Iowa.

History
Union Township was organized in 1854.

References

Townships in Louisa County, Iowa
Townships in Iowa